Republic Bank Ghana Limited is a commercial bank in Ghana. It is one of the commercial banks licensed by the Bank of Ghana, the central bank and national banking regulator.

Location
The headquarters of the bank are located at 48A, Sixth Avenue, North Ridge, Accra, Ghana. The geographical coordinates of the bank's headquarters are: 05°34'09.0"N, 0°11'40.0"W (Latitude:5.569167; Longitude:-0.194444).

Overview
, Republic Bank was a medium-sized financial services provider in Ghana, with total assets valued at GHS:3.377 billion (US$586.5 million) and shareholders' equity valued at GHS:574,616,000 (approximately US$99.8 million).

Republic Bank Group
Republic Bank Ghana Plc is a component and subsidiary of the Republic Bank Group, with headquarters in Trinidad and Tobago, with banking subsidiaries in Barbados, Cayman Islands, Ghana, Grenada, Guyana, Suriname and Trinidad and Tobago. As of 31 January, the group's holding company, Republic Financial Holdings Limited, had total assets of US$98.4 billion.

History
The bank was incorporated on 7 May 1990 as a private limited liability company. It was first licensed as a mortgage financing institution. It commenced business on 2 December 1991. On 1 August 1994, Bank of Ghana licensed the company, then called Housing Finance Company Ghana Limited, as a non-bank financial institution. Universal banking status was received on 17 November 2003, from Bank of Ghana.

The institution was listed on the Ghana Stock Exchange on 17 March 1995. On 13 May 2015, the bank, then HFC Bank received regulatory approval to become a subsidiary of Republic Financial Holdings Limited and become a member of the Republic Bank Group.

Ownership
As of September 2020, the bank's stock is owned by the following corporate entities and individuals:

Branch Network
Republic Bank has its headquarters in Accra, the capital city of Ghana. The branches of the bank and its subsidiary companies include the following locations:

 Head Office - Sixth Avenue, North Ridge, Accra
 Ebankese Branch - Sixth Avenue, North Ridge, Accra
 Accra Central Branch - Kwame Nkrumah Avenue, Accra
 Ridge Branch - 6 Sixth Avenue, West Ridge, Accra
 Tema Branch - Asafoatse Kotei Commercial Complex, Tema
 Legon Branch - Noguchi Road, University of Ghana, Legon
 Kumasi Branch - 571 Asomfo Road, Kumasi
 HFC Investment Services Limited - 6 Sixth Avenue, West Ridge, Accra
 Tudu Branch - St. Francis Building, Kinbu Road, Tudu
 Abossey Okai Branch
 Techiman Branch
 HFC Realty Limited
 Agbogbloshie Branch - Old Fadama Road
 Tamale Branch - 8 Daboya Street, Tamale
 KNUST Kumasi Branch - KNUST Commercial Area, Kumasi
 Koforidua Branch
 Baatsona Branch - Spintex Road
 Ashaiman Branch
 Takoradi Branch - Market Circle
 Kasoa Branch
 Post Office Square Branch
 Adabraka Branch
 Suame Branch - Suame Magazine
 Swedru Branch
 Cape Coast Branch - Tantri
 Winneba Branch
 Asamankese Branch
 Dansoman Branch

See also
 List of financial institutions in Ghana
 Ghana Stock Exchange

References

External links
 Official Website

Banks of Ghana
Companies based in Accra
Ghanaian companies established in 1990
Banks established in 1990
Companies listed on the Ghana Stock Exchange